The Tamron SP 15-30mm F/2.8 Di VC USD is an interchangeable wide-angle zoom lens announced by Tamron on September 12, 2014.

References
http://www.dpreview.com/products/tamron/lenses/tamron_15-30_2p8_vc/specifications

15-30
Camera lenses introduced in 2014